Imke Anne Marian Schellekens-Bartels (born 15 March 1977, in Eindhoven) is an equestrian from the Netherlands, who competed at the 2004 Summer Olympics in Athens, Greece and at the 2008 Summer Olympics in Beijing, China. She was the first reserve for the Dutch team at the 2012 Summer Olympics in London, United Kingdom. Her mother Tineke was also a competitor in dressage and competed at several Olympic Games between 1984 and 1996.

References

External links
 
 Dutch Olympic Committee

1977 births
Living people
Olympic equestrians of the Netherlands
Dutch female equestrians
Dutch dressage riders
Equestrians at the 2004 Summer Olympics
Equestrians at the 2008 Summer Olympics
Olympic silver medalists for the Netherlands
Sportspeople from Eindhoven
Olympic medalists in equestrian
Medalists at the 2008 Summer Olympics
Dressage trainers
21st-century Dutch women